Gold is a greatest hits album by Joe Cocker, released in 2006 as part of Gold album series.

Track listing

Disc 1
"Feelin' Alright" – 4:10
"With a Little Help from My Friends" – 5:12
"Delta Lady" – 2:51
"She Came in Through the Bathroom Window" – 2:38
"Something" – 3:33
"Darling Be Home Soon" – 4:42
"The Letter" (live) – 4:33
"Cry Me a River" (live) – 3:57
"High Time We Went" – 4:29
"Black-Eyed Blues" – 4:36
"Midnight Rider" – 3:58
"Put Out the Light" – 4:12
"I Can Stand a Little Rain" – 3:33
"You Are So Beautiful" – 2:44
"I Think It's Going to Rain Today" – 4:00
"The Jealous Kind" – 3:49
"Fun Time" – 2:38
"I'm So Glad I'm Standing Here Today" – 5:01

Disc 2
"Sweet Little Woman" – 4:02
"Many Rivers to Cross" – 3:44
"Up Where We Belong" – 3:53
"Civilized Man" – 3:55
"Shelter Me" – 4:21
"You Can Leave Your Hat On" – 4:14
"Unchain My Heart" – 5:06
"When the Night Comes" – 3:58
"Sorry Seems to Be the Hardest Word" – 3:59
"Night Calls" – 3:26
"Now That the Magic Has Gone" – 4:39
"Summer in the City" – 3:49
"Have a Little Faith in Me" – 4:16
"Sail Away" – 3:01
"Tonight" – 4:48
"First We Take Manhattan" – 3:43
"You Can't Have My Heart" – 4:00
"One" – 4:32

References

Cocker Joe
Joe Cocker compilation albums
2006 greatest hits albums